Haithem Loucif (born 8 July 1996) is an Algerian professional footballer who plays as a midfielder for Algerian Ligue Professionnelle 1 club USM Alger.

Club career
Loucif made his professional debut with Paradou AC in a 1–0 Algerian Ligue Professionnelle 1 loss to USM Bel-Abbès on 15 March 2018.

In 2019, Loucif Joined Angers.

In 2021, He joined USM Alger.

International career
Loucif made his debut for the Algerias in a friendly match against Qatar in December 2018.

References

External links
 

1999 births
Living people
People from Batna, Algeria
Association football midfielders
Algerian footballers
Algeria international footballers
Algeria under-23 international footballers
Algerian Ligue Professionnelle 1 players
Championnat National 2 players
Paradou AC players
Angers SCO players
21st-century Algerian people
Algeria A' international footballers
2022 African Nations Championship players